Monster on a Leash is an album by the American band Tower of Power, released in 1991. It peaked at No. 19 on Billboard'''s Contemporary Jazz Albums chart.

Production
Huey Lewis cowrote "How Could This Happen to Me" and "Keep Your Monster on a Leash". Tower of Power employed a 10-member lineup for the recording of the album.

Critical receptionThe Baltimore Sun wrote that "it's not the band's brassy bluster that makes it worth hearing, but the rhythm section's refried soul grooves." The Washington Post'' opined that "except for a few tracks ... the combination of Tom Bowes's rather generic R&B vocals and some uninspired lyrics is sorely outclassed by the group's surging horn arrangements and incessant dance grooves."

Track listing
All songs written by Emilio Castillo and Stephen "Doc" Kupka unless otherwise noted.

"A Little Knowledge (Is a Dangerous Thing)" - 4:24 (Castillo, Dana Meyers, Milo, Zeke Zirngiebel) 		
"How Could This Happen to Me" - 4:10		
"Who Do You Think You Are" - 4:22 (Bobbie Candler, Grillo, Greg Mathieson, Danny Seidenberg) 		
"Attitude Dance" - 5:36 		
"You Can't Fall Up (You Just Fall Down)" - 4:55 (Castillo, Skip Knape, Kupka) 		
"Funk the Dumb Stuff" - 5:27 		
"Believe It" - 4:35 (Adams, Castillo, Prestia) 		
"Personal Possessions" - 5:06 (Troy Dexter, Grillo) 		
"Miss Trouble (Got a Lot of Nerve)" - 4:45 (Castillo, Kupka, David Woodford) 		
"Keep Your Monster on a Leash" - 4:33 (Castillo, Kupka, Tim Scott, Huey Lewis)	
"Someone New" - 4:28 (Adams) 		
"Mr. Toad's Wild Ride" - 5:26 (Milo)

Personnel 
 Tom Bowes – lead vocals
 Nick Milo – keyboards
 Carmen Grillo – guitars, backing vocals
 Rocco Prestia – bass
 Russ McKinnon – drums, percussion
 Steve Grove – alto saxophone, tenor saxophone
 Emilio Castillo – tenor saxophone, backing vocals, lead vocals (6)
 Stephen 'Doc' Kupka – baritone saxophone
 Lee Thornburg – trombone, trumpet, flugelhorn, backing vocals, lead vocals (10)
 Greg Adams – trumpet, flugelhorn, backing vocals, horn and string arrangements

Production 
 Emilio Castillo – producer 
 Al Schmitt – recording, mixing 
 Bob Loftus – assistant engineer 
 Chris Rich – assistant engineer 
 Doug Sax – mastering at The Mastering Lab (Hollywood, California)
 Michael Caplan – A&R 
 Maureen Droney – production coordinator 
 Jerry Manuel – production manager 
 David Coleman – art direction 
 Nancy Donald – art direction 
 David Michalek – photography

References

Tower of Power albums
1991 albums
Epic Records albums